The 2018 European Taekwondo Championships, the 23rd edition of the European Taekwondo Championships, was held in Kazan, Russia at the Ak Bars Martial Arts Palace from 10 to 13 May 2018.

Medal table

Medal summary

Men

Women

Participating nations

References

External links 
 European Taekwondo Union
 Result book

European Taekwondo Championships
European Championships
Taekwondo Championships
2018 in Russian sport
International sports competitions hosted by Russia
Sport in Kazan
21st century in Kazan
European Taekwondo Championships